The 11th Flight Training Wing is a wing of the Japan Air Self-Defense Force. It is also sometimes known as the 11th Flying Training Wing. It comes under the authority of Air Training Command. It is based at Shizuhama Air Base in Shizuoka Prefecture.

It has two squadrons, both equipped with Fuji T-7 aircraft:
 1st Flight Training Squadron
 2nd Flight Training Squadron

References

Units of the Japan Air Self-Defense Force